Dr Ajit Swaran Singh is a Fijian-born-Indian-New Zealand judge who is appointed to the District Court Bench in New Zealand when he was sworn in as a judge in Manukau on 4 November 2002. He joined Wellington-based Ombudsman Judge Anand Satyanand (later the Governor-General) whose parents are of Fiji Indian descent, and Judge Avinash Deobhakta, of the Auckland District Court, who is an Indian from Uganda, as judges of New Zealand who are of Indian origin.

Judge Singh was also the first to be sworn into the high office on the Guru Granth Sahib, the Holy Book of the Sikh community. He was accorded the traditional Maori welcome by the ‘tangata whenua’. Judge Singh is the son of Sardar Swaran Singh, and nephew of the late Sarvan Singh, a well known lawyer and Member of Parliament in Fiji. He was born in Labasa and studied at Labasa Secondary School, now renamed Labasa College.

Award

References

The Indian – Indian judge takes office in Auckland
 New Zealand Gazette, 7 November 2002: Appointment of Ajit Swaran Singh, barrister and notary public of Auckland, to be a District Court Judge (announcement dated 22 October 2002).
 DR. AJIT SWARAN SINGH – NZ DISTRICT COURT JUDGE

Fijian emigrants to New Zealand
New Zealand jurists
Living people
District Court of New Zealand judges
1951 births
Fijian Sikhs
New Zealand Sikhs
People from Labasa
Recipients of Pravasi Bharatiya Samman